NOW was a British political and literary periodical founded in 1940 by George Woodcock, its first editor, from 1940 to 1941, and by Freedom Press from 1943 to 1947.

In the words of its founder, it was established as a review "for publishing literary matter and also as a forum for controversial writing which could not readily find publications under wartime conditions", and included works by "Anarchists, Stalinists, Trotskyists, pacifists, and New Statesman moderates".

In 1945 Now published Marie-Louise Berneri's "Sexuality and Freedom", one of the first
discussions of the ideas of Wilhelm Reich in Britain.

Orwell
In his reply to George Orwell's "London Letter", published in the March–April 1942 issue of Partisan Review, in which Orwell had mentioned NOW as an example of publications that published contributions by both pacificts and Fascists,  Woodcock stated that "the review had abandoned its position as an independent forum", and was now "the cultural review of the British Anarchist movement". The issue Orwell referred to featured "contributions from, among others, the Duke of Bedford, Alexander Comfort, Julian Symons, and Hugh Ross Williamson".

Now would later publish Orwell's article "How the Poor Die" in 1946.

Contributors
Mulk Raj Anand
Duke of Bedford 
Marvin Barrett 
Roy Campbell
Alexander Comfort
Rhys Davies
Hugh I'Anson Fausset 
Roy Fuller
James Hanley
Julian Huxley
Henry Miller
George Orwell
Mervyn Peake
Herbert Read
Keidrych Rhys
Kenneth Rexroth
F.A. Ridley
Rainer Marie Rilke (a reprint).
Derek Savage
Francis Scarfe
Theodore Spencer
Julian Symons
Ruthven Todd 
Wilfred Wellock
Hugh Ross Williamson

References

1940 establishments in the United Kingdom
1947 disestablishments in the United Kingdom
Anarchist periodicals published in the United Kingdom
Defunct literary magazines published in the United Kingdom
Defunct political magazines published in the United Kingdom
Magazines established in 1940
Magazines disestablished in 1947